Samuel Bryan Harper (born 10 December 1996) is an Australian cricketer. He made his first-class debut for Victoria on 3 February 2016 in the 2015–16 Sheffield Shield. He made his Twenty20 (T20) debut for Melbourne Stars on 26 December 2016 in the 2016–17 Big Bash League season.

In 2022, Harper was studying for a Bachelor of Health and Physical Education at Deakin University.

References

External links
 

1996 births
Living people
Australian cricketers
Victoria cricketers
Melbourne Stars cricketers
Melbourne Renegades cricketers
Cricketers from Melbourne
Cricket Australia XI cricketers
People from the City of Knox